Billy Moore (17 February 1910 – 31 March 1976) was a Welsh international dual-code rugby player who played rugby union for Bridgend RFC and rugby league for Rochdale Hornets. He was capped only once for Wales under the union code, for a match in the 1933 Home Nations Championship.

International matches played
Wales
  1933

Bibliography

References

1910 births
1976 deaths
Bridgend RFC players
Glamorgan County RFC players
Rochdale Hornets players
Rugby league players from Bridgend County Borough
Rugby union locks
Rugby union players from Bridgend County Borough
Wales international rugby union players
Welsh rugby league players
Welsh rugby union players